{{DISPLAYTITLE:H2N}}
The molecular formula H2N may refer to:

 Amino group
 Amino radical
 Azanide
 Nitrenium ion, or aminylium ion

H2N may also refer to the Zoom H2n Handy Recorder